Iqbal Nagar , is a town of the Punjab province of Pakistan. It is located at 32° 5' 30N 73° 47' 25E It is located in the Chichawatni Tehsil, which is an administrative subdivision of the District of Sahiwal. It is near Mian Channun city. There is a higher secondary school for both boys and girls separate, a post office and banks.

See also 
 Iqbal Nagar railway station

References

Populated places in Sahiwal District